Swalala is a rural settlement in Mbombela Local Municipality in Ehlanzeni District of the Mpumalanga province, South Africa.

During the national census of 2011 it was estimated that the 4.19 km2 village house almost 8,000 inhabitants, of which 99% were Black South Africans with 92% speaking Seswati as their home language.

Swalala is also a popular poem by Samike Ndisya that depicts Swalala as any remote place, mostly inhabited by a poor population.

References

 Swalala on wordpress.com

Populated places in the Mbombela Local Municipality